William Gale may refer to:

 William Gale (painter) (18231909), British painter
 William G. Gale (1959 ), American economist
 William H. Gale (fl. 1860s), associate justice of the Colorado Territorial Supreme Court
 William Kendall Gale (18731935), English Methodist missionary in northern Madagascar